The Consensus 1990 College Basketball All-American team, as determined by aggregating the results of four major All-American teams.  To earn "consensus" status, a player must win honors from a majority of the following teams: the Associated Press, the USBWA, The United Press International and the National Association of Basketball Coaches.

1990 Consensus All-America team

Individual All-America teams

AP Honorable Mention:

Greg Anthony, UNLV
Stacey Augmon, UNLV
Anthony Bonner, St. Louis
Jud Buechler, Arizona
Willie Burton, Minnesota
David Butler, UNLV
Elden Campbell, Clemson
Cedric Ceballos, Cal State Fullerton
Bimbo Coles, Virginia Tech
John Crotty, Virginia
Dale Davis, Clemson
William Davis, Oklahoma
Todd Day, Arkansas
LaPhonso Ellis, Notre Dame
Keith Gailes, Loyola (IL)
Gerald Glass, Ole Miss
Litterial Green, Georgia
Boo Harvey, St. John's
Nadav Henefeld, Connecticut
Skeeter Henry, Oklahoma
Carl Herrera, Houston
Tyrone Hill, Xavier
Keith Jennings, East Tennessee State
Alec Kessler, Georgia
Negele Knight, Dayton
Christian Laettner, Duke
Marcus Liberty, Illinois
Mark Macon, Temple
Kirk Manns, Michigan State
Lee Mayberry, Arkansas
Travis Mays, Texas
Eric McArthur, UC Santa Barbara
Mike Mitchell, Colorado State
Rodney Monroe, NC State
Dikembe Mutombo, Georgetown
Brian Oliver, Georgia Tech
Shaquille O'Neal, LSU
Billy Owens, Syracuse
Anthony Peeler, Missouri
Kevin Pritchard, Kansas
Chris Smith, Connecticut
LaBradford Smith, Louisville
Tony Smith, Marquette
Bryant Stith, Virginia
Felton Spencer, Louisville
Ed Stokes, Arizona
Mark Tillmon, Georgetown
Stephen Thompson, Syracuse
Clarence Weatherspoon, Southern Miss

References

NCAA Men's Basketball All-Americans
All-Americans